Leptodactylus bolivianus is a species of frog in the family Leptodactylidae. Its local name is sapo-rana boliviano ("Bolivian toad-frog").

It is found in Bolivia, Brazil, Colombia, Costa Rica, Ecuador, French Guiana, Guyana, Nicaragua, Panama, Peru, Suriname, Trinidad and Tobago, and Venezuela. Its natural habitats are subtropical or tropical dry forests, subtropical or tropical moist lowland forests, subtropical or tropical seasonally wet or flooded lowland grassland, rivers, intermittent rivers, shrub-dominated wetlands, swamps, freshwater marshes, intermittent freshwater marshes, arable land, pastureland, plantations, rural gardens, urban areas, heavily degraded former forest, ponds, aquaculture ponds, sewage treatment areas, irrigated land, seasonally flooded agricultural land, and canals and ditches. It is not considered threatened by the IUCN.

References

bolivianus
Amphibians of Bolivia
Amphibians of Brazil
Amphibians of Colombia
Amphibians of Costa Rica
Amphibians of Ecuador
Amphibians of French Guiana
Amphibians of Guyana
Amphibians of Nicaragua
Amphibians of Panama
Amphibians of Suriname
Amphibians of Trinidad and Tobago
Amphibians of Venezuela
Amphibians described in 1898
Taxonomy articles created by Polbot